Play Around a Man is a 1929 German silent film directed by Robert Land and starring Liane Haid, Anna Kallina, and Fred Louis Lerch.

The film's sets were designed by the art director Edgar G. Ulmer.

Cast

References

Bibliography

External links 
 

1929 films
Films of the Weimar Republic
Films directed by Robert Land
German silent feature films
German black-and-white films
1920s German films